"Tears Don't Lie" is a song by German DJ Mark 'Oh, released in as the third single from his debut album, Never Stop That Feeling (1995). The song uses the same melody best known in English-speaking countries as "When a Child is Born", which when originally a number-one hit in Germany for Michael Holm in 1974 was called "Tränen lügen nicht" or "Tears Don't Lie", which is a cover of the Italian Instrumental "Soleado" by Ciro Dammicco. "Tears Don't Lie" peaked at number-one in Austria, Belgium, Germany, and Sweden and was a top 10 hit across continental Europe and Ireland. It was also nominated to the 1996 Echo Awards for the best German dance single.

In 2002, the song was released in a new version, as "Tears Don't Lie 2002", peaking at number 35 in Germany and number 36 in Austria.

Critical reception
Alan Jones from Music Week wrote, "The oddest single of the week has to be Mark Oh's "Tears Don't Lie", which starts with some fairly ambient synth work before turning into a very fast techno track, overlaid with the humming melody from "When A Child Is Born". Already making its ascent of RMs On A Pop Tip chart, it's so unusual it can't help but attract attention and seems destined to maintain the Systematic label's 100% strike rate." James Hyman from the RM Dance Update gave it four out of five, saying, "Using Johnny Mathis "When A Child Is Born" theme, the Euro stomper adds its 140bpm-plus breakbeats, sped-up 'tears don't lie' bytes and great melodic breakdowns to great commercial effect." Another editor, James Hamilton, described it as a "insanely infectious German novelty".

Chart performance
"Tears Don't Lie" was very successful on the charts in Europe, remaining Mark Oh's biggest hit to date. It peaked at number-one in at least four countries; Austria, Belgium, Germany and Sweden. Additionally, it climbed into the top 10 in Denmark, Finland, Ireland, the Netherlands, Norway and Switzerland, as well as on the Eurochart Hot 100, where it hit number two. In the UK, the single reached number 24 in its first week on the UK Singles Chart, on 30 April 1995. But it reached number five on the RM UK on a Pop Tip Club Chart.

Music video
The accompanying music video for "Tears Don't Lie" was directed by Swedish-based director Matt Broadley. It was A-listed on Germany's VIVA in December 1994.

Track listings

 12-inch single
 "Tears Don't Lie" (12" Mix) – 4:57
 "Tears Don't Lie" (O. Lieb Remix) – 6:17
 "Tears Don't Lie" (Mark' Oh Remix) – 4:32
 "Tears Don't Lie" (Hooligan Remix) – 5:29

 CD single
 "Tears Don't Lie" (Short Mix) – 3:34
 "Tears Don't Lie" (12" Mix) – 4:55

 CD maxi
 "Tears Don't Lie" (12" Mix) – 4:55	
 "Ultimate" – 4:16	
 "Tears Don't Lie" (Shortmix) – 3:34

 CD maxi - Remixes
 "Tears Don't Lie" (O.Lieb Remix) – 6:17
 "Tears Don't Lie" (Mark' Oh Remix) – 4:36
 "Tears Don't Lie" (Hooligan Remix) – 5:34

Charts

Weekly charts

Year-end charts

References

1994 singles
1994 songs
Happy hardcore songs
Music videos directed by Matt Broadley
Number-one singles in Austria
Number-one singles in Germany
Number-one singles in Sweden
Techno songs
Ultratop 50 Singles (Flanders) number-one singles
Ultratop 50 Singles (Wallonia) number-one singles